Firmicus may refer to:

The lunar crater Firmicus.
The Christian astrologer Julius Firmicus Maternus (fourth century), after whom the crater is named.
Firmicus (spider), a spider genus